The Liga I is the top level women's football league in Romania. The champion team qualifies for UEFA Women's Champions League.

After the fall of communism, organised women's football started to take off, and the founded clubs were distributed  into 2 leagues - Divizia A with 12 teams and Divizia B with 30 teams grouped into 3 series, following a tournament called Cupa Libertății. In 2006, the league was rebranded as Liga I along with its male counterparts, since the name Divizia A was found to already be trademarked.

The top league was renamed Superliga for 4 seasons between the 2013–14 season, when the league-system was restructured, and until the 2016-17 season. Between these seasons, the name Liga I was given to the second-tier league.

Format
The league started with 12 teams at its creation in 1990. It has suffered various format changes since. In some years, a play-off was held to decide the champion. For the 2011–2012 season, the league was split into East and West divisions. Teams played each other twice with the top two teams advancing to the championship round. In 2012–13 the teams were split into three divisions, after which the top two teams each advanced to the championship round. Points from the regular season were reset to zero for that round. Starting from 2013–14 and until 2015–16 eight teams played each other twice- and the top four teams played the championship play-off, while the bottom four played a relegation play-off. The last two places in the relegation play-off got relegated. 
For 2016–17 the league was expanded to 10 teams, with no play-off. A play-off was reintroduced in the 2018–19 season, but since the 2019–20 season the league was expanded to 12 teams, dropping the play-off altogether.

Due to the 2019–20 edition being frozen halfway thanks to the 2019-20 coronavirus pandemic, no teams were supposed to be relegated and the league was planned to be temporarily expanded to 14 teams for the 2020–21 season. However, as two teams withdrew after the initial program was announced since they were unable to comply with medical protocol, a new draw was performed on 26 August 2020. Along with this new draw, a decision was made to change the play system: the remaining 12 teams will play a single round-robin for the regular season, after which the first six will enter a double round-robin play-off to decide the champion, while the remaining teams (six) will enter a double round-robin play-out to decide the relegated teams.

Winners
The following is a list of all Romanian women's top football league winners. The national champion is presented with the Romanian League trophy, and the top three teams currently receive gold, silver and bronze medals from the Romanian Football Federation.

Record Champions

References

External links
Official Site
League at women.soccerway.com

Women
Top level women's association football leagues in Europe
 
Professional sports leagues in Romania